Devil's Throat may refer to:

 Devil's Throat at Punta Sur, an underwater cave formation found near Cozumel
 Devil's Throat Cave, a cave in Bulgaria
 Devil's Throat, Iguazu Falls, a cliff at Iguazu Falls, Argentina
 Devil's Throat, a pit crater in Kilauea, Hawai`i